Phra That Choeng Chum a major and sacred religious monument of Sakon Nakhon Province, is enshrined at Wat Phra That Choeng Chum in town. Of rectangular shape, it is made of mortar and bricks with a height of 24 meters. It is featured on the reverse of the ten-satang coin.

Sakon Nakhon existed as a major city in the Khmer Empire of Khotraboon, with the ancient city of Srikhotraboon within present-day Udon Thani Province as the capital, at the height of its glory during the 12th to the 16th centuries. Many Khmer shrines and artefacts stand proof to the claim and constitute major attractions of the province. The Shrine of the Holy Relic of Narai Jengweng, Phuphek, Dum and the Khmer Bridge are a few examples.

Phra That Choeng Chum is built to cover footprints of four Buddhas namely Phra Kakusantha, Phra Konakom, Phra Kassapa, and Phra Kodom or Phra Sri Ariyametrei (the present Buddha). Next to the Phra That is the chapel that houses Luang Por Ong Saen, a sacred Buddha statue of the province.

External links
 Tourism Authority of Thailand

Buddhist temples in Sakon Nakhon Province